Thirkleby Hall was a large 18th-century country house in Great Thirkleby in the Hambleton hills of North Yorkshire. It was demolished in 1927.

History
The manor of Thirkleby was acquired in 1576 by William Frankland, a wealthy London merchant. It passed down in the Frankland family to William Frankland, who was made a baronet in 1660. It afterwards descended through the Frankland Baronets to Sir Thomas Frankland, 5th Baronet in 1783 (after the death of the 4th Baronet's second wife), who was an Admiral of the White in the Royal Navy and MP for Thirsk, but who died the following year. 

His son Sir Thomas Frankland, 6th Baronet commissioned James Wyatt to build a new house, stables and triumphal arch in classical style; it was completed in 1790. The 6th Baronet's son, Sir Robert Frankland-Russell, 7th Baronet, had no son and following his death in 1849, the estate passed to his cousin's third daughter who had married Sir William Payne-Gallwey, 2nd Baronet two years earlier. (The baronetcy passed to his cousin Frederick William Frankland). In 1881 the estate passed to Sir William's son, Sir Ralph Payne-Gallwey. When Ralph's son was killed in the First World War Sir Ralph decided to sell the estate by auction.

The house failed to sell and was demolished in 1927. The entry arch/gatehouse still stands and is in use. The stables building is also still present. A holiday caravan park has been built to the east of it.

References

Robinson, John, Felling the Ancient Oaks, Aurum Press, 2011, 

Country houses in North Yorkshire
British country houses destroyed in the 20th century